Spirifer is a genus of marine brachiopods belonging to the order Spiriferida and family Spiriferidae. Species belonging to the genus lived from the Middle Ordovician (Sandbian) through to the Middle Triassic (Carnian) with a global distribution. They were stationary epifaunal suspension feeders.

Selected species 

 Spirifer acutiplicatus Hayasaka, 1933
 Spirifer bambadhurensis Diener, 1903
 Spirifer baschkirica Tschernyschew, 1902
 Spirifer battu Gemmellaro, 1899
 Spirifer byrangi Chernyak, 1963
 Spirifer carnicus Schellwien, 1892
 Spirifer concentricus Lee and Su, 1980
 Spirifer distefanii Gemmellaro, 1899
 Spirifer dvinaensis Licharew, 1927
 Spirifer enderlei Tschernyschew, 1902
 Spirifer engelgardthi Chernyak, 1963
 Spirifer fritschi Schellwien, 1892
 Spirifer holodnensis Chernyak, 1963
 Spirifer lirellus Cvancara, 1958
 Spirifer malistanensis Plodowski, 1968
 Spirifer muensteri Suess, 1854
 Spirifer opimus Hall, 1858
 Spirifer pentagonoides Plodowski, 1968
 Spirifer pentlandi d'Orbigny, 1842
 Spirifer perlamellosus Hall, 1857
 Spirifer piassinaensis Chernyak, 1963
 Spirifer postventricosus Tschernyschew, 1902
 Spirifer pseudotasmaniensis Einor, 1939
 Spirifer rakuszi Einor, 1946
 Spirifer rockymontanus Marcou, 1858
 Spirifer schellwieni Tschernyschew, 1902
 Spirifer siculus Gemmellaro, 1899
 Spirifer spitiensis Stoliczka, 1865
 Spirifer strangwaysi De Verneuil, 1845
 Spirifer striatus Martin, 1809
 Spirifer subgrandiformis Plodowski, 1968
 Spirifer subtrigonalis Gemmellaro, 1899
 Spirifer supracarbonicus Tschernyschew, 1902
 Spirifer supramosquensis Nikitin, 1890
 Spirifer tareiaensis Einor, 1939
 Spirifer tegulatus Trautschold, 1876
 Spirifer undata Reed, 1944
 Spirifer uralicus Tschernyschew, 1902
 Spirifer zitteli Schellwien, 1892

Reassigned species 
As Spirifer has been described early on, since then, many species have been reassigned.

 S. archiaciformis = Sinospirifer subextensus
 S. bisulcatus = Angiospirifer bisulcatus
 S. chinensis mut. α = Sinospirifer subextensus
 S. gortanioides = Plicapustula gortanioides 
 S. hayasakai = Lamarckispirifer hayasakai
 S. heterosinosus  = Sinospirifer subextensus
 S. martellii = Plicapustula martellii
 S. pekinensis = Plicapustula pekinensis
 S. pellizzarii = Sinospirifer subextensus 
 S. pellizzariformis  = Sinospirifer subextensus 
 S. pinguis = Latibrachythyris pinguis
 S. rotundatus = Latibrachythyris rotundatus 
 S. subhayasakai  = Sinospirifer subextensus
 S. verneuili = Cyrtospirifer verneuili
 S. verneuili var. subarchiaci = Plicapustula subarchiaci
 S. verneuili var. subextensus = Sinospirifer subextensus
 S. vilis = Sinospirifer subextensus
 S. wangleighi  = Sinospirifer subextensus
 S. yassensis = Spinella yassensis

References

External links 
 Zipcodezoo
 Sepkoski, Jack Sepkoski's Online Genus Database

Spiriferida
Prehistoric brachiopod genera
Paleozoic animals of Africa
Paleozoic animals of Asia
Paleozoic animals of Europe
Paleozoic animals of North America
Fossils of Georgia (U.S. state)
Paleozoic brachiopods of South America
Carboniferous Bolivia
Devonian Brazil
Carboniferous Brazil
Devonian Colombia
Fossils of Colombia
Floresta Formation
Devonian Peru
Ordovician first appearances
Carnian extinctions
Jeffersonville Limestone
Paleozoic life of Ontario
Paleozoic life of Alberta
Paleozoic life of British Columbia
Paleozoic life of New Brunswick
Paleozoic life of the Northwest Territories
Paleozoic life of Nunavut
Paleozoic life of Quebec
Paleozoic life of Yukon
Fossil taxa described in 1818